American Export-Isbrandtsen Lines, New York, was the leading US-flag shipping company between the U.S. east coast and the Mediterranean from 1919 to 1977, offering both cargo ship and passenger ship services, until it declared bankruptcy and was acquired by Farrell Lines of New York.

Company history

American Export Lines (I)
Export Steamship Corporation was organized in 1919 and began operating cargo services to the Mediterranean from New York.  The word American was added in the 1920s to emphasize its ties to the U.S.  In 1931, they placed in service four cargo-passenger liners, Excalibur, Excambion, Exeter and Exochorda, known as the "Four Aces". The timing of their new service was unfortunately at the beginning of the Depression. The company went through various reorganizations and became the American Export Lines in 1936. During World War II American Export Lines operated transports for the U.S. War Shipping Administration. In 1964, it merged with Isbrandtsen Co. to become the American Export-Isbrandtsen Lines.

Isbrandtsen Steamship Company
In 1917, Hans Isbrandtsen formed a shipping company name Hans Isbrandtsen Inc. in Delaware and the Pan American Terminal & Dock Corporation in New York City. The shipping company underwent changes when Hans Isbrandtsen and his cousin A. P. Møller, the shipping magnate who formed the great Maersk Line, began a joint venture in 1919 forming the Isbrandtsen-Moller Company (ISMOLCO) in New York.  ISMOLCO grew rapidly when in 1928, a long-term agreement was reached with Ford Motor Corporation, shipping auto parts and general cargo for Japan, China and the Philippines via the Panama Canal. Isbrandtsen founded the Isbrandtsen Steamship Company in 1939 to operate ships in areas where ISMOLCO was not involved. In 1940, this joint venture dramatically transformed due to "Permanent Special Instructions One" issued by Møller, upon which A. P. Møller's son Mærsk Mc-Kinney Møller was made a partner. In 1941, the joint venture ended. Møller and his son went on to found the Interseas Shipping Co., Inc., the predecessor to the Moller Steamship Company, an agent for the Mærsk Line in the United States While Interseas Shipping Co., Inc., operated mainly in the Atlantic, Isbrandtsen Steamship Company traded mainly in the Far East. Hans's son Jakob took over the company in 1953 upon Hans's passing and bought American Export Lines in 1960.  The purchase was approved by the United States Maritime Administration in 1962.  Jakob Isbrandtsen merged Isbrandtsen Co. with American Export Lines in 1964 to form American Export & Isbrandtsen Lines, which a year later changed its name to American Export-Isbrandtsen Lines.

American Export-Isbrandtsen Lines
Jakob Isbrandtsen formed the American Export-Isbrandtsen Lines in 1964 by merging his two shipping companies.  Also in 1964, Isbrandtsen, who became a majority stake holder in Ward Industries in 1960, restructured it and in 1967 formed American Export Industries, Inc., a holding company to manage American Export-Isbrandtsen Lines and all support for his fleet operations, including container services, port operations and fleet logistics.  In 1971, American Export Industries spun off its holdings and returned to being the American Export-Isbrandtsen Lines. This merger ended in 1973.

American Export Lines (II)
American Export Lines (AEL), re-emerged after the dissolution of the American Export-Isbrandtsen Lines in 1973.  AEL sold their Staten Island Marine Terminal to the City of New York in 1974.  After heavy losses and unable to meet crippling debt payments, AEL went into bankruptcy in July 1977, with Farrell Lines buying its port operations in New York City and its remaining ships a year later, including two container ships on order or already under construction at Bath Iron Works, the Argonaut and Resolute, which were delivered directly to Farrell. Farrell Lines was acquired by Royal P&O Nedlloyd in July 2000; in turn, Royal P&O Nedlloyd was acquired by A.P. Moller-Maersk Group in August 2005.  The port operations formerly associated with the American Export-Isbrandtsen Lines became part of the Dubai Ports World controversy in February 2006.

Passenger shipping services
Their first passenger ships were actually combination passenger-cargo ships, known as "Four Aces", Excalibur, Exeter, Excambion and Exochorda.  These ships were ordered built by AEL during the time when the company's president was Henry Herbman, an old-time dockman in New York.  They were built by the New York Shipbuilding Company, headed up by Clinton L. Bardo, and first launched in 1931. However,  Herbman was not a good businessman and the ships had not been paid for.  J. E. Slater, who was with the consulting firm Coverdale and Colpitts of New York City, was asked to look into their finances, and he quickly found that the business was not being run efficiently.  Finally the Maritime Commission removed Herbman from his position and J. E. Slater was asked to run the company for a few years to stabilize it.  The company's financial position improved significantly, assisted by a life insurance policy Herbman had bought himself, which was paid to the company and settled the debt problem. (This information was found in Slater's taped memoirs which were passed on to his children and grandchildren.)  With the exception of the Exochorda, the ships were lost during World War II as a result of enemy fire.  The Exochorda was later sold to Turkish Maritime Lines and renamed Tarsus.

Following the war, the tonnage was replaced with C-3 class troop transports with the same names.  They were given luxury appointments for 125 passengers as well as sufficient cargo-carrying capacity.

The vessels were designed in their entirety by Henry Dreyfuss and the names were chosen by a competition. O. J. "Skip" Weber, Slater's son-in-law, entered both names and won the prize. The ship was "sponsored" at its launching by Mrs. John E. (Pauline) Slater. On April 4, 1956, Grace Kelly sailed on the  when she traveled to Monaco to wed Prince Rainier.

Subsidiaries
 American Export Airlines
 Colonial Tankers Corporation
 Container Marine Lines Isbrandtsen
 Container Marine Lines

Ships

 SS Adelphi Victory (MCV-760) (operated by Isbrandtsen Line), VC2-S-AP2
  (MCV-792), VC2-S-AP2
 SS Antioch Victory (MCV-816) (operated by Isbrandtsen Line), VC2-S-AP2
 SS Atlantic, C4 type
 SS Baylor Victory (MCV-772) (operated by Isbrandtsen Line), VC2-S-AP2
 SS Beaver Victory (operated by Isbrandtsen Line)
 SS Horace Binney (MCE-62) (operated by American Export Lines Inc.)
 SS Blair (assigned to Export Steamship Corp.), renamed SS Exchange (1)
 SS Blue Triangle (assigned to Export Steamship Corp.), renamed SS Exmouth (1)
 SS Brandon Victory (operated by Isbrandtsen Line)
 SS Brimsen Heights, transferred in 1946, formerly known as SS American Banker of the United States Lines
 SS Adm. Wm. M. Callaghan (operated by American Export-Isbrandtsen Lines)
 SS Cape Nome
 SS Cape Race
 SS Carenco (assigned to Export Steamship Corp.)
 SS Charles Carroll (MCE-15) (operated by American Export Lines Inc.)
 SS Caspiana (operated by Isbrandtsen Line)
 SS City of Athens
 SS City of St. Joseph (assigned to Export Steamship Corp.), renamed SS Extavia (1)
 SS Clontarf (assigned to Export Steamship Corp.), renamed SS Exermont (1)
 SS Coeur D’Alene (assigned to Export Steamship Corp.), renamed SS Examilia
 SS Coeur d'Alene Victory (operated by Isbrandtsen Line)
 SS Colby Victory (operated by Isbrandtsen Line)
 
 SS Container Dispatcher container ship
 SS Container Forwarder container ship
 SS Corson (assigned to Export Steamship Corp.), renamed SS Exiria (1)
 SS Defiance
 Delta King (owned by Isbrandtsen Line)
 Delta Queen (owned by Isbrandtsen Line)
 SS East Point Victory (operated by Isbrandtsen Line)
 SS Elmira Victory (operated by Isbrandtsen Line)
 SS Empire Glencoe
 SS Eugene Hale (MCE-791) (operated by American Export Lines Inc.)
 SS Examelia
 SS Examiner (1)
 SS Examiner (2)
 SS Exanthia (1)
 SS Exanthia (2), C2-S-A1, Maritime Commission design
 SS Exarch
 SS Exbrook
 SS Excalibur (1) (photo)
 SS Excalibur (2)
 SS Excambion (1)
 SS Excambion (2)
 SS Excellency (1)
 SS Excellency (2)
 SS Excellency (3)
 SS Exceller, C2-S-A1, Maritime Commission design
 SS Excello (1)
 SS Excello (2)
 SS Excelsior (1)
 SS Excelsior (2)
 SS Excelsior (3)
 SS Excelsior (4)
 SS Exchange (1), renamed SS Exliona (2)
 SS Exchange (2)
 SS Exchequer (1) (photo)
 SS Exchequer (2)
 SS Exchequer (3)
 SS Exchester (1)
 SS Exchester (2)
 SS Exchester (3), renamed SS Exmoor (3)
 SS Exchester (4)
 SS Exchester (5)
 SS Executive
 SS Executor (1)
 SS Executor (2)
 
 SS Exermont (1), C3-E, Maritime Commission design
 SS Exermont (2)
 SS Exeter (1)
 SS Exeter (2)
 SS Exford (1)
 SS Exford (2)
 SS Exhibitor (1)
 SS Exhibitor (2)
 SS Exilona (1)
 SS Exilona (2)
 SS Exilona (3)
 SS Exiria (1), renamed SS Exchester (3)
 SS Exiria (2), C2-S-A1, Maritime Commission design
 SS Exminster (1)
 SS Exminster (2)
 SS Exmoor (1)
 SS Exmoor (2)
 SS Exmoor (3)
 SS Exmouth (1)
 SS Exmouth (2)
 SS Exochorda (1)
 SS Exochorda (2)
 SS Expeditor
 SS Explorer
 SS Export Adventurer
 SS Export Agent
 SS Export Aide
 SS Export Ambassador
 SS Export Banner
 SS Export Bay
 SS Export Builder

 SS Export Buyer
 SS Export Challenger
 SS Export Champion
 SS Export Commerce
 SS Export Courier
 SS Export Defender
 SS Export Democracy
 SS Export Diplomat
 CV Export Freedom IMO 7204863, container ship
 CV Export Leader IMO 7226689, container ship, (MA-257), now the US Navy's 
 CV Export Patriot IMO 7306764, container ship, operated by Farrell Lines until 1998, scrapped in Alang India.
 SS Exporter (1)
 SS Exporter (2), C3-E, Maritime Commission design
 SS Expositor
 SS Express (1)
 SS Express (2)
 SS Express (3)
 SS Extavia (1), renamed as SS Exmoor (2)
 SS Extavia (2), C2-S-A1, Maritime Commission design
 SS Exton (1)
 SS Exton (2)
 SS Exton (3)
 SS Faraby
 SS William P. Fessenden (MCE-768) (operated by American Export Lines Inc.)
 SS Flying Arrow
 SS Flying Clipper
 SS Flying Cloud
 
 SS Flying Endeavor
  (1)
 SS Flying Enterprise (2)
 SS Flying Fish, a modified C-2 type cargo ship
 SS Flying Gull
 SS Flying Hawk
 SS Flying Foam
 SS Flying Independent
 SS Flying Spray
 SS Flying Trader
 SS Samuel Gorton (MCE-1459) (operated by American Export Lines Inc.)
 SS Great Republic
 SS Hannis Taylor (MCE-1978) (operated by Isbrandtsen Steamship Co.Inc.)
 SS Hog Island
 SS Robert F. Hoke (MCE-1968) (operated by American Export Lines Inc.)
 SS Hoke Smith (MCE-1061) (operated by American Export Lines Inc.)
 
 SS John Chandler (MCE-215) (operated by American Export Lines Inc.)
 SS Sir John Franklin
 SS John L. Motley (MCE-986) (operated by American Export Lines Inc.)
 SS John N. Robins (MCE-819) (operated by American Export Lines Inc.)
 SS Judge Bland
 SS Kingston Victory (operated by Isbrandtsen Line)
 SS La Guardia 
 SS Lahaina Victory (operated by Isbrandtsen Line)
 SS Lake Festina
 SS Lake Fiscus
 SS Lake Frumet
 SS Lake Grampus
 SS Liberty Land
 CV Lightning IMO 6817845, container ship, now the US Navy's 
 SS Luxpalile
 SS Marine Angel
 SS Marine Carp
 SS Marine Flasher
 SS Marine Jumper
 SS Marine Perch
 SS Marine Shark
 SS Martin Berhman
 SS Meredith Victory
 SS Meridian Victory
 SS Michael J. Owens (MCE-2958) (operated by American Export Lines Inc.)
 SS Millinocket, torpedoed June 18, 1942
 SS Minot Victory (operated by Isbrandtsen Line)
 SS New Orleans
 SS Niantic Victory (MCV-100) (operated by Isbrandtsen Line)
 SS Nobles
 SS Notre Dame Victory (operated by Isbrandtsen Line)
 SS Orion Hunter (operated by Isbrandtsen Line)
  (MCE-2436) (operated by Isbrandtsen Steamship Co.Inc.)
 SS Pass Christian Victory (operated by Isbrandtsen Line)
 SS Remsen Heights
 SS Red Jacket
 SS Darel M. Ritter (MCE-2838) (operated by American Export Lines Inc.)
 SS Sangamon
 SS Saucon
 SS Saugus
 NS Savannah
 SS Sawokla
 SS Sea Falcon
 CV Sea Witch IMO 6806444, container ship
 SS Seton Hall Victory (operated by Isbrandtsen Line)
 
 SS Sinsinawa
 CV Staghound IMO 6916433, container ship, now the US Navy's 
 SS Unicoi
 SS Zebulon B. Vance (MCE-145) (operated by American Export Lines Inc.)
 SS Vulcania
 SS Charles D. Walcott (MCE-2327) (operated by American Export Lines Inc.)
 SS Ward
 SS Will R. Wood (MCE-1956) (operated by American Export Lines Inc.)
 SS Winona
 SS Young America

List of principal executives
 Henry Herbermann, 1920–1935
 William Hugh Coverdale, 1934–1949
 John E. Slater, 1934–1956
 John F. Gehan, 1939–1959
 William J. Dorman, 1952-1965
 Frazer A. Bailey, 1957–1959
 Josephine Bay Paul, 1959–1960
 Jakob Isbrandtsen, 1960–1971
 John M. Will, 1959–1971

See also
 South Street Seaport Museum, where Jakob Isbrandtsen served as its trustee

References

 National Cyclopedia of American Biography, vol. 41.
 Dugan, James. American Viking: The Saga of Hans Isbrandtsen (New York: Harper and Row, 1963)
 De la Pedraja, René. The Rise and Decline of U.S. Merchant Shipping in the Twentieth Century (New York: Twayne, 1992)
 De la Pedraja Tomán, René. A Historical Dictionary of the U.S. Merchant Marine and Shipping Industry Since the Introduction of Steam (Westport, CT: Greenwood Press, 1994).

External links
 Wikisource: Isbrandtsen-Moller Company v. United States (Syllabus, Opinion of the Court)
 "Rugged Individualist". Time. January 16, 1950. — 
 "Sea Lawyer". Time. October 9, 1950.
 Maritime Matters — index of Ocean liners and cruise ships
 Passenger service time tables American Export Lines
 Passenger service time tables for ISMOLCO
 Postcards featuring American Export Lines ships
 The Last Ocean Liners - American Export Lines - trade routes and ships of American Export Lines in the 1950s and 1960s
 Josephine Bay Paul and C. Michael Paul Foundation
 Flags of the Isbrandtsen Steamship Company
 Flags of the American Export Lines
 Flag of the American Export-Isbrandtsen Lines
 Passenger service dinnerware
 Detailed history of American Export Lines
 History of American Export Industries
 Shipbuilding under the Merchant Marine Act of 1936
 Video: A Circle Line trip around Manhattan, early 1968
 American Export Lines History and Ephemera GG Archives

 
Transport companies established in 1919
Transport companies disestablished in 1977
Container shipping companies of the United States
Defunct companies based in New York (state)
Defunct cruise lines
Defunct shipping companies of the United States
Ferry companies of New York City
Transatlantic shipping companies
1919 establishments in New York (state)
1977 disestablishments in New York (state)
Container shipping companies